Human Body: Pushing the Limits is a four part television documentary series that premiered on the Discovery Channel on March 2, 2008 in North America. The first two episodes aired March 2, and the final two aired March 9 at 9:00 p.m. and 10:00 p.m. E.S.T.

This show covers how the body reacts under extreme stress like being stuck in a cave or running away from forest fires. It is made up of four episodes that all concentrate on certain aspects of the body:

Strength - How the muscles react under stress. Includes stories of people lifting masses 6 times his or her weight or running at speeds that Olympic runners can't match.
Sight - How the eyes can see better and with more detail in emergency situations (including lucid dreaming).
Sensation - Reactions to pain and similar sensations, as well as how techniques such as hypnosis, meditation, and focus can alter perception of them.
Brain Power - Focused on brain power and how it reacts to life threatening situations.

References

External links
 

Human Body: Pushing the Limits (Discovery Channel)

Discovery Channel original programming
Documentary specials
2008 American television series debuts
2008 American television series endings
American documentary television series
Television series by Banijay